Annabi is the surname of the following people

Abu Ubaidah Yusef al-Annabi (born 1969), Algerian jihadi
Ali Annabi (born 1939), Tunisian fencer
Amina Annabi (born 1962), French-Tunisian singer-songwriter
Dheyab Al-Annabi (born 1990), Qatari footballer
Hédi Annabi (1943–2010), Tunisian diplomat

See also
Roqq-e Annabi, Iranian village